Micheal Colvin Barrow (born April 19, 1970) is a former American college and professional football player who was a linebacker in the National Football League (NFL) for twelve seasons.  He played college football for the University of Miami, and was honored as a consensus All-American.  He was drafted by the Houston Oilers in the second round of the 1993 NFL Draft, and also played professionally for the Carolina Panthers, New York Giants and Dallas Cowboys of the NFL.

Early years
Barrow was born in Homestead, Florida.  He attended Homestead High School, and played high school football for the Homestead Broncos.

College career
While attending the University of Miami, Barrow played for the Miami Hurricanes football team from 1989 to 1992.  The Hurricanes were consensus national champions twice during Barrow's college career (1989, 1991), and played for a third national championship (1992).  As a senior in 1992, he was recognized as a consensus first-team All-American.

Professional career
In thirteen NFL seasons, Barrow also played for the Carolina Panthers, New York Giants, Washington Redskins and Dallas Cowboys. While playing for the New York Giants in the 2003 season, he led the NFC with 150 tackles. He finished his career with 1,125 tackles and 43 sacks.

Coaching

High school
After retiring from the NFL, Barrow got his start in coaching at his alma mater, Homestead High School, as the Assistant Head Coach and defensive coordinator for the 2006 season.

College
Barrow was the Linebackers Coach and Special Teams Coordinator at his alma mater, the University of Miami, where he won two national championships as a player. He entered his 7th year on the Hurricanes' coaching staff going into the 2013 season. He was originally hired by former Miami Head Coach Randy Shannon in 2007, and was retained on staff by current Head Coach Al Golden when Golden was hired in 2010.

Professional
Barrow was named the Linebackers Coach for the Seattle Seahawks on February 9, 2015.

Personal life
Barrow has four children: Mikenzi, Kaleb, John Michael, and Michael.

References

External links
 Miami Hurricanes bio
 The 50 Greatest Miami Hurricanes

1970 births
Living people
All-American college football players
American football linebackers
Carolina Panthers players
Dallas Cowboys players
Houston Oilers players
USC Trojans football coaches
Miami Hurricanes football coaches
Miami Hurricanes football players
New York Giants players
Seattle Seahawks coaches
People from Homestead, Florida
Sportspeople from Miami-Dade County, Florida
Washington Redskins players